Pterostichus honnoratii is a species of ground beetles belonging to the family Carabidae.

Subspecies
 Pterostichus honnoratii honnoratii (Dejean, 1828) 
 Pterostichus honnoratii ludovici Schatzmayr, 1930 
 Pterostichus honnoratii sellae Stierlin, 1881

Description
The three subspecies differ in the morphology of posterior angles (ssp. sellae: obtuse and blunt; ssp. honnoratii: right and protruding) and anterior angles (ssp. honnoratii: protruding; ssp. ludovici: little protruding) of pronotum. These beetles are predatory.

Distribution
This species is present in Italy,  in France and in Switzerland.

Habitat
P. honnoratii lives in the high alpine areas and in lower altitude in forests. It prefers the limestone screes and the debris of calcareous schists. These beetles can be found under rocks and prefer slightly moist, sandy soil.

References

External links
 Galerie insecte

Pterostichinae
Beetles described in 1828